Crimebusters, is a 1976 Italian "poliziottesco" film directed by Michele Massimo Tarantini.

Cast 
Henry Silva as Major Paolo Altieri 
Antonio Sabàto as Police commissioner Paolo Tosi
Ettore Manni as Lawyer Vieri
Silvia Dionisio as Anna  
Franca Scagnetti as Donna al parco

Release
Crimebusters was released theatrically in Italy on May 11, 1976 where it was distributed by Capitol. It grossed a total of 698,998,550 Italian lire.

Reception
Roberto Curti, author of Italian Crime Filmography, 1968-1980 stated that the film was "standard fare", finding the political angle of the film rushed.

See also     
 List of Italian films of 1976

References

Works cited

External links

1976 films
1976 crime films
Films directed by Michele Massimo Tarantini
Poliziotteschi films
Films scored by Guido & Maurizio De Angelis
1970s Italian films